Pape is a given name. Notable people with the name include:

 Pape Badiane (born 1980), French basketball player
 Pape Abdou Camara (born 1991), Senegalese footballer
 Pape Samba Ba (born 1982), Senegalese footballer
 Pape Cire Dia (born 1980), Senegalese football
 Pape Diakhaté (born 1984), Senegalese footballer
 Pape Moussa Diakhatè (born 1989), Senegalese footballer
 Papé Diakite (born 1992), Senegalese footballer
 Pape Maly Diamanka (born 1990), Senegalese footballer
 Pape Diop (born 1954), Senegalese politician
 Pape Alioune Diop (died 2012), Senegalese football coach
 Pape Bouba Diop (born 1978), Senegalese footballer
 Pape Malick Diop (born 1974), Senegalese footballer
 Pape Seydou Diop (born 1979), Senegalese footballer
 Pape Diouf (born 1951), Senegalese journalist and football manager
 Pape Alioune Diouf (born 1989), Senegalese footballer
 Pape Mamadou Diouf (born 1982), Senegalese footballer
 Pape Paté Diouf (born 1986), Senegalese footballer
 Pape Niokhor Fall (born 1977), Senegalese footballer
 Pape Omar Faye (born 1987), Senegalese footballer
 Pape Maguette Kebe (born 1979), Senegalese footballer
 Pape Moussa Konaté (born 1993), Senegalese footballer
 Pape M'Bow (born 1988), Senegalese footballer
 Pape Hamadou N'Diaye (born 1977), Senegalese footballer
 Pape Latyr N'Diaye (born 1977), Senegalese footballer
 Pape Paye (born 1990), French footballer
 Pape Landing Sambou (born 1987), Senegalese footballer
 Pape Sané (born 1990), Senegalese footballer
 Pape Sarr (born 1977), French-Senegalese footballer
 Pape Souaré (born 1990), Senegalese footballer
 Pape Sow (born 1981), Senegalese basketball player
 Pape Habib Sow (born 1985), Senegalese footballer
 Pape Sy (born 1988), French-Senegalese basketball player
 Pape Thiaw (born 1981), Senegalese footballer